John Brooke may refer to:

Politicians
 John Brooke, 1st Baron Cobham (1575–1660), English politician and Royalist
 Sir John Brookes, 1st Baronet (c. 1635–1691), MP for Boroughbridge, also known as Sir John Brooke
 John Brooke (1755–1802), Warwickshire politician
 John Henry Brooke (1826–1902), Australian politician and journalist
 John R. Brooke (1838–1926), Civil War Union officer and governor of Cuba
 John Brooke, 2nd Viscount Brookeborough (1922–1987), Northern Ireland politician
 John Brooke alias Cobham (1535–1594), MP for Queenborough
 John Brooke Johnson Brooke, soldier and heir to the Raj of the Kingdom of Sarawak

Others
 John Brooke (translator) (died 1582), English translator of religious works
 John Brooke (East India Company), 17th century commander of first British vessel to sight Australian mainland
 John Charles Brooke (1748–1794), English antiquarian, Somerset Herald
 John Mercer Brooke (1826–1906), inventor, sailor, Confederate marine officer
 SS John M. Brooke, a Liberty ship
 John Brooke (priest) (1873–1951), Dean of Cape Town from 1932 to 1947
 John Weston Brooke (1880–1908), British officer and explorer
 John Brooke (British historian) (1920–1985), British historian
 John L. Brooke (born 1953), American historian
 John Hedley Brooke (born 1944), professor of science and religion
 John Balmain Brooke (1907–1992), New Zealand teacher, yacht designer and engineer

See also
 John Broke, MP for Marlborough
 John Brookes (disambiguation)
 John Brooks (disambiguation)